Municipal elections were held in Bologna on 15 and 16 May 2011. The centre-left candidate Virginio Merola was elected mayor at the first round with 50.47% of votes. The turnout was just 71%, a decrease compared to 2009 and 2004 elections.

Background
The election took place before the end of the legislature because the incumbent mayor Flavio Delbono, who was under investigation after the Cinziagate scandal. Delbono was forced to announce his resignation as mayor on 25 January 2010 following the revelation that he was being investigated for crimes such as embezzlement, fraud and aggravated abuse of office. The investigation followed Delbono's former assistant's claim that he had spent public money on her— the pair had been having an affair. Investigators subsequently questioned Delbono about the purchase of a property near St. Julian's, Malta. Delbono denied all the allegations made against him and said that resigning as mayor was the right thing to do. He has announced that he will return to lecturing and is working to clear his name. His resignation was confirmed on 28 January following the approval of an emergency budget, the election to appoint Delbono's successor must take place by 28 March 2010.

For 15 months, Bologna was governed under a special commissioner, Anna Maria Cancellieri, an exceptional event in post-war Italian politics.

Voting system
The voting system is used for all mayoral elections in Italy, in the city with a population higher than 15,000 inhabitants. Under this system voters express a direct choice for the mayor or an indirect choice voting for the party of the candidate's coalition. If no candidate receives 50% of votes, the top two candidates go to a second round after two weeks. This gives a result whereby the winning candidate may be able to claim majority support, although it is not guaranteed.

The election of the City Council is based on a direct choice for the candidate with a preference vote: the candidate with the majority of the preferences is elected. The number of the seats for each party is determined proportionally.

Parties and leaders

Results

References

2011 elections in Italy
Bologna
Bologna
Elections in Bologna
May 2011 events in Italy